The 2019 National Women's Soccer League season was the seventh season of the National Women's Soccer League, the top division of women's soccer in the United States. Including the NWSL's two professional predecessors, Women's Professional Soccer (2009–2011) and the Women's United Soccer Association (2001–2003), it was the thirteenth overall season of FIFA and USSF-sanctioned top division women's soccer in the United States.

The league is operated by the United States Soccer Federation and receives major financial backing from that body. Further financial backing is provided by the Canadian Soccer Association. Both national federations pay the league salaries of many of their respective national team members in an effort to nurture talent in those nations and take the financial burden of individual clubs.

Teams, stadiums, and personnel

Stadiums and locations 

The Dash does not make its stadium's entire capacity available for home games, instead restricting ticket sales at a lower level. The full capacity of this venue is included in parentheses and italics.

Two stadiums were renamed during the season. First, on June 4, Exploria Resorts acquired the naming rights to Orlando City Stadium, which was accordingly renamed Exploria Stadium. Then, on June 13, the U.S. arm of the Spanish multinational bank BBVA announced a rebranding of the U.S. operations from "BBVA Compass" to "BBVA". As part of the rebranding, BBVA Compass Stadium became simply BBVA Stadium.

Personnel and sponsorship 

Note: All teams use Nike as their kit manufacturer.

Coaching changes

League standings

Tiebreakers 
The initial determining factor for a team's position in the standings is most points earned, with three points earned for a win, one point for a draw, and zero points for a loss. If two or more teams tie in point total, when determining rank and playoff qualification and seeding, the NWSL uses the following tiebreaker rules, going down the list until all teams are ranked.

 Head-to-head win–loss record between the teams (or points per game if more than two teams).
 Greater goal difference across the entire season (against all teams, not just tied teams).
 Greatest total number of goals scored (against all teams).
 Apply #1–3 to games played on the road.
 Apply #1–3 to games played at home.
 If teams are still equal, ranking will be determined by a coin toss.
NOTE: If two clubs remain tied after another club with the same number of points advances during any step, the tiebreaker reverts to step 1 of the two-club format.

Attendance

Average home attendances
Ranked from highest to lowest average attendance.

Updated through end of regular season on October 12, 2019.

Highest attendances
Regular season

Updated through end of regular season on October 12, 2019.

Statistical leaders

Top scorers

Top assists

|}

Shutouts

Hat-tricks

4 Scored 4 goals

NWSL Playoffs 

The top four teams from the regular season compete for the NWSL Championship. The North Carolina Courage secured the number one seed on September 21, winning their third straight NWSL Shield.

Semi-finals

Championship

Individual awards

Monthly Awards

Player of the Month

Team of the Month

Weekly awards

Annual awards

References

External links 

 
2019
National Women's Soccer League